Ambalavao can stand for the following municipalities. Both are in Madagascar:

 Ambalavao, Antananarivo - a rural municipality south of Antananarivo.
 Ambalavao - an urban municipality in Haute Matsiatra.